Argeneh, also rendered as Argena and Argana, may refer to:
 Argeneh-ye Olya
 Argeneh-ye Sofla